John De Lacy Wooldridge,  (18 July 1919 – 27 October 1958) was a Royal Air Force officer and bomber pilot, and a British film composer.

Early life
Wooldridge was born in Yokohama, Japan, and was educated at St Paul's School, London. A talented music composer and academic, he studied music under Sibelius and was a friend and contemporary of William Walton.

Second World War
Wooldridge joined the Royal Air Force as a sergeant pilot in 1938. During the Second World War, he was a member of RAF Bomber Command, flying a total of 97 operational bombing sorties. He was affectionately known as "Dim".

He served with No. 207 Squadron based at RAF Bottesford flying Avro Manchesters. He then served with No. 106 Squadron as one of Wing Commander Guy Gibson's flight commanders, before being appointed commanding officer of No. 105 Squadron in March 1943, which specialised in low level precision daylight bombing using de Havilland Mosquito aircraft.

Wooldridge wrote a book, Low Attack, about these operations in 1944.

In May 1944, while in America, Wooldridge volunteered to ferry one of the first Canadian-built Mosquitoes across the Atlantic to Britain and, accompanied by Flying Officer C. J. Brown as navigator, set a new record for the Atlantic crossing from Goose Bay, Labrador to the United Kingdom, of 5 hours, 46 minutes. The previous record for the Labrador-Britain route had been held by a BOAC Liberator at 7 hours 56 minutes.

Wooldridge was aeronautical adviser to the Petroleum Warfare Department during the development of the Fog Investigation and Dispersal Operation (FIDO) fog dispersal system.

Musical career
His first professionally performed work was the symphonic poem A Solemn Hymn for Victory, premiered by Artur Rodzinski and the New York Philharmonic Orchestra at Carnegie Hall on 30 Nov. 1944. Rodzinski reportedly had promised to give him one performance of his work for every five German planes he shot down.  Later that year John Barbirolli conducted the Halle Orchestra in the UK premiere.
 
Wooldridge also contributed the score and co-wrote the screenplay to the 1953 film based on his own story, Appointment in London featuring Dirk Bogarde as a Wing commander.

Personal life

Wooldridge's first marriage was in 1942 to Mary Latham, with whom he had a son, Morris Latham, who also became a pilot. The union ended in divorce. He subsequently married the actress Margaretta Scott in 1948, with whom he had a daughter, Susan Wooldridge, who also became an actress; and a son, Hugh Wooldridge.

Wooldridge was killed in a car accident in England aged 39 and is buried at St Lawrence's Church Cholesbury, Buckinghamshire, with his second wife, Margaretta.

Film scores
 RX for Murder – (1958) – (US title: Prescription for Murder)
 Soapbox Derby – (1958)
 Count Five and Die – (1958)
 The Last Man to Hang? – (1956)
 Appointment in London – (1952)
 Crow Hollow – (1952) – (uncredited)
 Blackmailed – (1951)
 Torment – (1950) – (US title: Paper Gallows)
 The Woman in Question – (1950) – (US title: Five Angles on Murder)
 Conspirator – (1949)
 Edward, My Son – (1949)
 A Journey for Jeremy – (1949) (short)
The Guinea Pig – (1948) – (US title: The Outsider)
 Fame is the Spur – (1947)
Atomic Achievement - (1956)

Musical works
 The Constellations (1944)
 A Solemn Hymn To Victory (1944)
 The Elizabethans
 Largo for Orchestra
 Prelude for an Unwritten Tragedy
 Prelude for a Great Occasion a.k.a. Music for a Great Occasion
 Song of the Summer Hills
 Slow March for the Royal Air Force
 The Saga of the Ships

References

External links
 
  colour profile of Wooldridge's Mosquito B.Mk IV DZ548 that he flew from RAF Marham
 Mosquito Creates Atlantic Record
 "Atlantic Record Breaker" a picture of the Mosquito flown across the Atlantic by Wooldridge

1919 births
1958 deaths
English film score composers
English male film score composers
Road incident deaths in England
Royal Air Force officers
British World War II pilots
British World War II bomber pilots
Companions of the Distinguished Service Order
Recipients of the Distinguished Flying Medal
Recipients of the Distinguished Flying Cross (United Kingdom)
20th-century classical musicians
20th-century English composers
British aviation record holders
People from Yokohama
People educated at St Paul's School, London
20th-century British male musicians